The Madou Daitian Temple or Temple of the Heavenly Viceroys is a temple in Nanshi Village, Madou District, Tainan, Taiwan.

History
The temple was originally constructed in the 17th century as the Baoning Temple. After an earthquake, the temple was relocated to another place and renamed Bao'an Temple. In 1955, the temple was rebuilt and renamed Madou Daitian Temple. The construction took around 10 years to be completed.

Architecture
The temple was designed with sculptures and paintings over an area of 3 hectares. The roof is covered with tiles. It is constructed with Quanzhou architectural style. In the backyard, there is a 76 meter long and 7 meter high Chinese dragon statue which was built in 1979. The dragon mouth forms a 5-meter diameter entrance to the tunnel stretched along the dragon body.

See also
 Wang Ye worship
 Gushan Daitian Temple, Kaohsiung
 Beiji Temple
 Grand Matsu Temple
 Taiwan Confucian Temple
 State Temple of the Martial God
 Temple of the Five Concubines
 List of temples in Taiwan
 List of tourist attractions in Taiwan

References

17th-century religious buildings and structures
1955 establishments in Taiwan
Taoist temples in Taiwan
Temples in Tainan